"Wild" is a single by English singer-songwriter Jessie J and the lead single from her  second studio album, Alive (2013). The single released in the United Kingdom and Ireland features American rapper Big Sean and British MC Dizzee Rascal, while the single released in other countries such as Australia, the United States and the Netherlands only features Big Sean. It was written by Jessica Cornish, Claude Kelly, Dylan Mills, Joshua Coleman and Sean Anderson and produced by Ammo. The single was released as a download on 26 May 2013 in the United Kingdom. it reached #38 in the UK year-end chart, selling more than 300,000 copies. it also ended up at #71 in the Australian year-end chart, selling more than 150,000 copies.

Background
Songwriter Claude Kelly penned "Wild", which features rappers Big Sean and Dizzee Rascal and was produced by American musician Ammo, who is signed to Dr. Luke's publishing company Prescription Songs as a producer and songwriter. Jessie J told Capital London that she wanted someone "really British" and "really American" in terms of guests. "We wrote the song and I actually had a middle eight," she explained, "and I said to Claude Kelly, who's the executive producer on this album, 'I feel like this should have a rapper on it' and I was like 'how about two?'".
The song is in the key of B minor.

Music video
The music video was directed by Emil Nava. The video leaked on 25 May 2013. The music video opens with the singer, with her newly shaved blonde hair from Comic Relief, walking onto the video's set. She then begins to dance, which is intercut with scenes of her wearing what looks to be a leopard print bodysuit. Jessie J revealed in an interview that the leopard print is actually sprayed onto her skin. Big Sean and Dizzee Rascal also appear to rap their verses, and then continue to dance with Jessie throughout the ending of the video.

Live performances
On 22 May, Jessie J posted a clip of an acoustic version of "Wild" onto her YouTube account. The video attracted over a million views within two weeks. The day before the song's release, 25 May, Jessie J performed an acoustic snippet of the song at her headline slot at the Mawazine festival in Morocco. The first televised performance of the track was Sound of Change's "Chime for Change Live" benefit concert in Twickenham Stadium. The performance was broadcast to 150 countries around the globe on 1 June. The same day, the song was performed at the All Starz Summer Party in Reading's Madejski Stadium. The song has been promoted at several European music festivals throughout the summer of 2013.

Track listings
Digital download
 "Wild" (featuring Big Sean and Dizzee Rascal) – 3:54

Worldwide digital download
 "Wild" (featuring Big Sean) – 3:43

Digital download — The Wild EP
 "Wild" (no rap edit) – 3:28
 "Wild" (instrumental) – 3:27
 "Wild" (featuring Big Sean and Dizzee Rascal) (Show N Prove remix) – 4:10
 "Wild" (Show 'N' Prove instrumental) – 4:09

CD Single
 "Wild" - 3:29
 "Wild" (featuring Big Sean & Dizzee Rascal) - 3:54

Charts and certifications

Weekly charts

Year-end charts

Certifications

Release history

References

2013 singles
Big Sean songs
Dizzee Rascal songs
Jessie J songs
Songs written by Jessie J
Songs written by Claude Kelly
Song recordings produced by Ammo (record producer)
Lava Records singles
2013 songs
Songs written by Ammo (record producer)
Songs written by Big Sean